Raymond Johnson III  (born October 21, 1998) is an American football defensive end for the Cincinnati Bengals of the National Football League (NFL). He played college football for Georgia Southern.

College career
Johnson played for the Georgia Southern Eagles for four seasons. As a senior, he was named first-team All-Sun Belt after recording 14.5 for loss and five sacks. Johnson finished his collegiate career with 150 tackles, 36 tackles for loss, 16.5 sacks, six fumble recoveries, five passes defended and two forced fumbles.

Professional career

New York Giants
Johnson was signed by the New York Giants as an undrafted free agent on May 2, 2021. He made the team out of training camp. In Week 11 against the Tampa Bay Buccaneers Johnson III recorded his first career sack on Blaine Gabbert.

On May 18, 2022, Johnson was waived.

Cincinnati Bengals
On July 25, 2022, Johnson signed with the Cincinnati Bengals. He was waived on August 30, 2022 and signed to the practice squad the next day. He signed a reserve/future contract on January 31, 2023.

References

External links 
 Georgia Southern Eagles bio
 New York Giants bio

1998 births
Living people
Players of American football from Columbia, South Carolina
American football defensive ends
Georgia Southern Eagles football players
New York Giants players
Cincinnati Bengals players